Andrei Valeryevich Pushkarev (born 15 March 1985) is a former Russian professional footballer.

Club career
He played in the Russian Football National League for FC Petrotrest St. Petersburg in 2005.

External links
 
 

1985 births
Living people
Russian footballers
Association football defenders
Russian expatriate footballers
FC Zenit Saint Petersburg players
FC Zenit-2 Saint Petersburg players
FC Petrotrest players
FC Naftan Novopolotsk players
FC Okzhetpes players
FC Aktobe players
FC Rotor Volgograd players
FC Gornyak Uchaly players
FC Sakhalin Yuzhno-Sakhalinsk players
FC Tyumen players
Belarusian Premier League players
Kazakhstan Premier League players
Expatriate footballers in Belarus
Expatriate footballers in Kazakhstan
Russian expatriate sportspeople in Kazakhstan